Bonine is a surname. Notable people with the name include:

 Eddie Bonine (born 1981), American baseball player
 Elias Bonine (1843–1916), American photographer
 Fred Bonine (1863–1941), American athlete and eye doctor

See also
 Bonini (surname)